Mersin Grand Mosque is a Grand Mosque in Mersin, Turkey.

History 
The original mosque, then named Yeni Cami, was built in 1898 by the leading people (like Abdülkadir Seydavi) of Mersin. In the 1970s, the mosque has been rebuilt and was renamed Ulucami.

The building 
The mosque is in Akdeniz secondary municipality of Mersin (Central Mersin). It is at the intersection of the main streets. Atatürk Park is to the south and business quarter of the city is to the north and west.  The square ground area of the mosque is about  The mosque shares this area with a small shopping area named Ulu Çarşı. The parking area is below the basement.
It is a three-storey mosque. The prayer section for 3000 people and nartex is at the ground floor. The conference room for 400 people and Youth center is at the basement. There are two minarets one at the east and one at the west. Each minaret has two şerefes (minaret balconies)

See also
 List of Turkish Grand Mosques

References

External links
Photos of the mosque

Mosques in Mersin
Mosque buildings with domes
Mersin
Mosques completed in 1898
Mosques completed in 1979
1898 establishments in the Ottoman Empire
19th-century religious buildings and structures in Turkey
20th-century religious buildings and structures in Turkey